Thomas Joseph Walker (March 25, 1877 – January 18, 1945) was a judge of the United States Customs Court.

Education and career

Thomas Walker was born on March 25, 1877, in Plymouth, Pennsylvania, but moved with his family to Montana when he was thirteen. Walker attended Georgetown University and the University of Virginia but received no degrees. He served in the United States Armed Forces in 1898. He was elected to the Montana House of Representatives in 1905, and was a county attorney in Silver Bow County, Montana from 1906 to 1910. He worked in private law practice in Butte, Montana from 1909 to 1922 and again from 1934 to 1940. He was a member of the Montana Senate from 1922 to 1934.

Federal judicial service

Walker was nominated by President Franklin D. Roosevelt on June 11, 1940, to a seat on the United States Customs Court vacated by Judge Jerry Bartholomew Sullivan. He was confirmed by the United States Senate on June 15, 1940, and received his commission on June 20, 1940. His service terminated on January 18, 1945, due to his death in New York City, New York.

References

Sources
 

1877 births
1945 deaths
Judges of the United States Customs Court
People from Luzerne County, Pennsylvania
People from Plymouth, Pennsylvania
Georgetown University alumni
University of Virginia alumni
United States Article I federal judges appointed by Franklin D. Roosevelt
20th-century American judges